James Satterfield  (October 11, 1939 – May 6, 2019) was an American football coach. He served as head football coach at Furman University from 1986 to 1993, where he compiled a record of 66–29–3.

Career
Satterfield was named the AFCA Coach of the Year in 1988 after leading Furman to an overall 13–2 record while being Southern Conference co-champions and then defeating Georgia Southern in the 1988 NCAA Division I-AA Football Championship Game. Satterfield was the second Furman football head coach to be the AFCA Division I-AA Coach of the Year; in 1985, three years earlier, Dick Sheridan won the award after leading the Paladins to a 12–2 record and a close two-point loss in the National Championship game.

Satterfield was the head football coach at Lexington High School, in Lexington, South Carolina from 1996 to 2003.

Death
Satterfield died of complications from heart surgery in 2019 at the age of 79.

Head coaching record

College

References

1939 births
2019 deaths
Furman Paladins football coaches
High school football coaches in South Carolina
People from Lancaster, South Carolina
Sports coaches from South Carolina